The 1938 Men's World Weightlifting Championships were held in Vienna, Nazi Germany from October 21 to October 23, 1938. There were 38 men in action from 11 nations.

Medal summary

Medal table

References
Results (Sport 123)
Weightlifting World Championships Seniors Statistics

External links
International Weightlifting Federation

World Weightlifting Championships
World Weightlifting Championships
World Weightlifting Championships
International weightlifting competitions hosted by Austria